Put return may refer to:
 Shot put return channel, labor-saving accessory device for track and field shot putting 
 Misspellings of other sport terms:
 "Punt return", defense task in gridiron football
 "Putt return", labor-saving device for putting drill in golf